Mateusz Borkowski (born 2 April 1997) is a Polish middle-distance runner competing primarily in the 800 metres. He won a bronze medal in 4 × 800 metres relay at the 2017 IAAF World Relays.

International competitions

Personal bests

Outdoor
400 metres – 48.58 (Ostróda 2018)
800 metres – 1:45.42 (Berlin 2018)
1000 metres – 2:18.88 (Szczecin 2018)
1500 metres – 3:41.97 (Gdańsk 2015)	
Indoor
400 metres – 49.96 (Bratislava 2017)
600 metres – 1:18.36 (Łódź 2018)
800 metres – 1:47.11 (Toruń 2017)
1000 metres – 2:26.11 (Łódź 2016)
1500 metres – 3:45.83 (Spała 2016)

References

1997 births
Living people
Polish male middle-distance runners
Athletes (track and field) at the 2014 Summer Youth Olympics
People from Starachowice
Athletes (track and field) at the 2020 Summer Olympics
Olympic athletes of Poland